St. Nicholas Russian Orthodox Cathedral (Свято-Николаевский собор РПЦ в Нью-Йорке) is located in the Upper East Side of Manhattan, New York City and is the administrative center of the Russian Orthodox Church in North America.

History
St. Nicholas Russian Orthodox Cathedral was built in 1901–1902 from the designs of John Bergesen, a New York City architect of Russian origin. Its style is derived from Baroque architecture as it had evolved in Moscow. The construction in New York City of a traditional Russian church provided local parishioners with a familiar and reassuring place of worship.

The St. Nicholas congregation, which was established in 1894, met in a rented house at 323 Second Avenue until a permanent building could be erected. The purchase of the 75 by 100 foot lot, on which the present church buildings stand, was undertaken by Dean Alexander Hotovitsky on behalf of the congregation in September 1899. The lot was smaller than what had initially been sought, and it was not a corner site, but the high cost of real estate in New York limited the selection. The New York City congregation was unable to
fully finance the building, so the Synod of Russia was given Imperial permission to collect money throughout the Russian Empire.

The ceremony of laying the cornerstone took place on May 22, 1901, the day of the Feast of Translation, commemorating the transfer of the relics of St. Nicholas from Myra in Lycia, Asia Minor, to Bari, Italy in 1087. On November 23, 1902, a consecration service, the first to be held in the completed church, was led by Bishop Tikhon, the head of the Russian Church in the Aleutian Islands and North America. Bishop Charles Chapman Grafton, representing the Episcopal Church, participated in the service. The Russian Holy Synod elevated St. Nicholas Church to Cathedral status in December 1903, and the Diocesan Seat of North America was transferred from San Francisco to New York in 1905. Restoration work was carried out on the Cathedral between 1954 and 1960. Today St. Nicholas Cathedral continues to serve the needs of the Russian Orthodox Church in the United States as it has since its founding.

The sanctuary of the Cathedral accommodates 900 people. A hall for a school and for meetings, space for a printing press, storerooms, quarters for a superintendent, and service facilities were provided in the basement.

A three-story rectory, immediately to the west of the church, is an integral part of the architectural composition. The round-arched entrance, surrounded by bead-and-reel and rope moldings, is surmounted by a low triangular pediment decorated with a shell motif. At the second floor three arched window openings are separated by paired colonnettes. Within each opening are a pair of pendant arches. The third floor windows are crowned by pedimented dormers projecting from the sloping roof. A terra-cotta band, continued from the church, accents the base of the roof.

The colorful elements of the composition are architecturally unified into a rich and exuberant example of Russian Baroque architecture. St. Nicholas Cathedral is important both for its architectural design and for the role played in the city's history by the Russian Orthodox Church in North America.

References
http://s-media.nyc.gov/agencies/lpc/lp/0834.pdf

Cathedrals in New York City
Russian Orthodox cathedrals in the United States
Russian Orthodox church buildings in the United States
Church buildings with domes
Rusyn-American culture in New York (state)
Russian-American culture in New York City
Eastern Orthodox churches in New York City
New York City Designated Landmarks in Manhattan
Upper East Side
1894 establishments in New York (state)
Religious organizations established in 1894
Churches completed in 1902